ENSafrica (Edward Nathan Sonnenbergs) is Africa's largest law firm. ENSafrica currently has over 620 practitioners and was established over 100 years ago. The firm specialises in all commercial areas of Law, Tax, Forensics and IP. The firm is a Level 2 Broad-Based Black Economic Empowerment (BBBEE) contributor. ENSafrica is one of the traditional "Big Five" law firms in South Africa.

History

Edward Nathan & Friedland
Edward Nathan & Friedland was formed in 1905. In 1999, Edward Nathan & Friedland was bought by Nedbank for R400 million. After an exodus of clients and lawyers, as well as deeming the investment non-core, in 2004, Nedbank sold Edward Nathan & Friedland back to 47 directors for R50 million. In addition to the purchase price, R33 million in available cash in Edward Nathan & Friedland was transferred to Nedbank. In total, Nedbank suffered a loss of R20 million on the sale.

Sonnenberg Hoffmann & Galombik
Sonnenberg Hoffmann & Galombik was formed in 1936.

Edward Nathan Sonnenbergs
The firm was formed after a 2006 merger between Cape Town-based law firm Sonnenberg Hoffmann Galombik (SHG) and the Johannesburg-based law firm Edward Nathan & Friedland.

Divisions

Its specialist divisions include Africa regulatory and business intelligence, Asia-Africa trade (including China, India, and Japan), and structuring of investments through Mauritius.

Offices
In August 2012, ENSafrica became the first African headquartered law firm with integrated offices across different African jurisdictions, with the opening of offices in Rwanda and Burundi, which office was closed in 2015.

This was shortly followed by another office opening in the Ugandan capital of Kampala in December 2012. In December 2013, ENSafrica announced a merger with Mauritius' largest and oldest firm, De Comarmond & Koenig.

On 1 November 2014, the firm announced the opening of two offices in the Namibian capital Windhoek and Swakopmund respectively, with a third Namibian office, in Walvis Bay, opening soon thereafter. This was done through a merger with local Namibian law firm Lorentz Angula.

Former CEO, Piet Faber, is quoted (31 March 2014) as saying that ENSafrica will open offices in at least six other African jurisdictions over the next two years.

On 1 May 2015, the firm announced the opening of its 13th office on the African continent, following a merger with local Tanzanian law firm, Rex Attorneys.

In 2015, ENSafrica closed its Burundi office.

The most recent office to be opened was formed through a merger with local Ghanaian firm Oxford & Beaumont Solicitors, and formally opened as ENSafrica Ghana on 1 December 2015. Oxford & Beaumont Solicitors was the first Ghanaian firm to open representative offices in London.

The company has offices in several countries and cities:
 Ghana: Accra
Kenya: Nairobi
 Mauritius: Port Louis
 Namibia: Windhoek, Swakopmund, Walvis Bay
 Rwanda: Kigali
 South Africa: Alexandra (Pro Bono Office), Cape Town, Durban, Johannesburg, Mitchells Plain (Pro Bono Office), Stellenbosch
 Tanzania: Dar es Salaam
 Uganda: Kampala

Controversies

Julius Malema
In 2010 and 2011, ENSafrica acted for Julius Malema in a court case brought against him by Afriforum in relation to his singing of the song "shoot the boer" (shoot the farmer / white person). The firm subsequently withdrew from the case, resulting in Malema accusing the firm of racism. Ultimately, on 12 September 2011, Malema was convicted of hate speech.

Tax Evasion
In a court action brought in the Western Cape High Court in 2018, the South African Revenue Service claimed that ENSafrica created a R3.5 billion tax evasion scheme involving Christo Wiese and Tullow Oil. In addition to pursuing Christo Wiese and Tullow Oil, the South African Revenue Service is also pursuing a former ENSafrica executive.

References

Law firms of South Africa
Companies based in Johannesburg
Law firms established in 1905
1905 establishments in South Africa